James Hobson Morrison (December 8, 1908 - July 20, 2000) was an American lawyer and politician who served twelve terms as a Democratic member of the United States House of Representatives from Louisiana from 1943 to 1967.

Early life and career 
James H. Morrison was born in Hammond, Louisiana on December 8, 1908. He attended the public schools and graduated from the Tulane University School of Law in New Orleans in 1934. He passed the bar and began a private legal practice in Hammond. He supported better treatment for strawberry pickers and founded a labor newspaper.

He ran unsuccessfully for governor in 1939 and again in 1944.

Tenure in Congress 
In 1942, he ran as a Democrat for a seat in the U.S. House, seeking to represent Louisiana's 6th congressional district. He won election and would serve in Congress for the next 24 years.

He was initially assigned to serve on five committees, but after only a few days he stepped down from those committees because they dealt with issues less directly impactful to his district than the agricultural concerns he sought to represent. He quickly gained a reputation as a populist and supporter of federal highway funding in his district.

He was a delegate to the Democratic National Conventions in both 1956 and 1960.

Civil rights
Morrison was one of the few southern Democrats to support President John F. Kennedy’s proposed civil rights legislation. In 1965, he voted for the Voting Rights Act, which many believe cost him his seat.

Defeat and later career 
In 1966, he was defeated in the Democratic primary election by Louisiana judge John R. Rarick, an ardent segregationist.

After leaving Congress, he returned to Hammond to take up his law practice. He became a prolific fundraiser and supporter of Southeastern Louisiana University, to which he had also steered federal contracts during his time in office.

Death
James Morrison died in Hammond on July 20, 2000, following a series of health problems, including two heart attacks and a stroke. His body is interred at Episcopal Church Cemetery in Hammond.

He was survived by his wife of 60 years, Marjorie Abbey Morrison and their two sons, James Jr. and Benjamin.

References

External links

 http://bioguide.congress.gov/scripts/biodisplay.pl?index=M000995
 http://bioguide.congress.gov/scripts/biodisplay.pl?index=H000667
 https://web.archive.org/web/20070603034246/http://www.selu.edu/acad_research/programs/csls/morrison_lecture_ser/index.html
 http://politicalgraveyard.com/bio/morrison.html
''Congressional Quarterly's Guide to Elections", Gubernatorial primary elections, 1940, 1944, 1948; Congressional general elections, 1960 and 1964
 United States Social Security Death Index
 http://www2.selu.edu/NewsEvents/PublicInfoOffice/MorrisonLecture_Blossman.html

1908 births
2000 deaths
Louisiana lawyers
Tulane University Law School alumni
People from Hammond, Louisiana
20th-century American lawyers
20th-century American politicians
20th-century American Episcopalians
Democratic Party members of the United States House of Representatives from Louisiana